Vice Versa (stylized in all caps) is the second studio album by Puerto Rican singer Rauw Alejandro. It was released on June 25, 2021, by Sony Music Latin and Duars Entertainment. Two weeks after finalizing his debut studio album, Afrodisíaco (2020), Alejandro started recording his sophomore album, going experimental on it and having a departure from his signature music styles. He worked with several producers, including Tainy, Caleb Calloway, and Mr. Naisgai to create the album. Musically, Vice Versa consists of electropop and house tracks, reggaeton songs, Latin pop numbers, bolero lines, and Brazilian funk rhythms. After the album's release, Alejandro embarked on the Rauw Alejandro World Tour and the Vice Versa Tour in 2021 and 2022, respectively.

The album was supported by five singles: "2/Catorce", "Todo de Ti", "Sexo Virtual", "Cúrame", and "Desesperados". The global hit "Todo de Ti" topped the charts in 18 countries and reached the top three on Billboards Hot Latin Songs and Billboard Global 200 charts, becoming the third all-Spanish song in history to reach the top three on the latter. The song was nominated for both Record of the Year and Song of the Year at the 22nd Annual Latin Grammy Awards. "Desesperados" peaked at number one in nine countries, as well as the top five on Hot Latin Songs. "Todo de Ti", "Cúrame", and "Desesperados" all reached the summit of the Latin Airplay and Latin Rhythm Airplay charts in the United States.

Vice Versa received generally favorable reviews from music critics, who complimented its various genres and the singer's versatility. Rolling Stone ranked the album as the best Spanish-language or bilingual album of 2021 and the third-best album of the year. It was nominated for Favorite Latin Album at the American Music Awards and Top Latin Album at the Billboard Music Awards, both in 2022. The album was a commercial success. It debuted atop the US Top Latin Albums and Latin Rhythm Albums with first-week sales of 21,000 units. It has also spent 54 weeks on Billboard 200, making it the sixth Spanish album in history to spend more weeks on the chart. Additionally, Vice Versa spent nine weeks at number one in Spain. The album has received several certifications, including octuple platinum (Latin) in the United States.

Background and recording

Rauw Alejandro released his debut studio album, Afrodisíaco on November 13, 2020. The album experienced both critical and commercial success, being nominated for Best Música Urbana Album at the 64th Annual Grammy Awards. Two weeks after finishing the work on Afrodisíaco, he started working on his sophomore studio album, Vice Versa. On the latter, he got a departure from his "signature reggaeton and Latin R&B", going "experimental". During an interview with Billboard, he explained:

Alejandro added that he tries to connect with his fans in every project that he does, by putting his "heart and soul on the table" and expressing his "art to the maximum". In an interview with Vice, he told the magazine that he does not like to repeat projects and the things he does: "If we play a lot of music of that genre, people get saturated, we always have to give them a break so that when they come back again, they'll come back strong." He also wanted the album to be "more personal" than Afrodisíaco and reduced the number of collaborations on it. He worked on Vice Versa with the assistance of several producers, including Tainy, Caleb Calloway, Álvaro Díaz, and Mr. Naisgai. In an interview with Rolling Stone, Calloway stated that Alejandro was "planning to make something like Vice Versa for years", and since Afrodisíaco "was his first big project", the team "wanted to make sure [they] had a more commercial approach". He added: "The next album, we wanted it to be more experimental."

Music and lyrics

Vice Versa is a Spanish language album composed of 14 songs, consisting electropop and house tracks, reggaeton songs, Latin pop numbers, bolero lines, and Brazilian funk rhythms. Lyrically, the album is divided into three facets; it begins with love songs, then there are breakup and heartbreak lyrics, and eventually a recovery and healing. "Todo de Ti" is a dance-pop and electropop song, with elements of disco, pop, Latin pop, dance, electro, and nu-new-wave. The track was inspired by funk from the music of singers James Brown and Bruno Mars, as well as "the nostalgia of the 1980s". is a romantic song about a girl who drives Alejandro crazy and makes his heart race, while the hopeless singer confesses he likes everything about her. A reggaeton and electronic perreo, "Sexo Virtual" is an erotic song about "overcoming distance, bringing the bodies together", with Alejandro exposing "some of his deepest fantasies".

In "Nubes", which is a reggaeton and pop song with elements of electronic music, Alejandro declares his eternal love to the girl who has won his heart. A collaboration with Puerto Rican singer Chencho Corleone, "Desesperados" is an upbeat reggaeton song, with elements of cumbia and dembow, about two people who are apart, but still have love for each other, so they somehow try to get back together. An Urbano Latin R&B song, "2/Catorce" is about passionate and sexual moments as a couple, and situations where the temperature rises. The trap-bolero ballad "Aquel Nap ZzZz", features elements of R&B and reggaeton, and is a romantic love song dedicated to Alejandro's girlfriend Rosalía. The song includes Rosalía's vocals and was inspired by their relationship.

"Cúrame" is a lofi hip hop reggaeton ballad, with urban and tropical rhythms, that narrates a love story referring to two relationships; the current one and the one from the past, which continues to leave its mark today. "Cosa Guapa" transforms from dancehall into deep house, and includes verses in English. "Desenfocao'" is a new wave, synth-pop, and funk song, with elements of disco, pop, EDM, and deep house, and finds the singer very confused after a relationship breakup, so that he barely even knows where he is. "¿Cuándo Fue?" is a downbeat heartbreak ballad, while both "La Old Skul" and "¿Y Eso?" nod to the old-school reggaeton, with the former sampling "En La Cama" by Nicky Jam and Daddy Yankee. On the trap-pop song "Tengo un Pal", Alejandro collaborated with Puerto Rican singer Lyanno, while he featured Brazilian singer Anitta on the baile funk track "Brazilera".

Singles
"2/Catorce" serves as the lead single of Vice Versa. It was accompanied by a music video posted to YouTube, directed by Eric Duars and Alejandro. Both were surprise-released on February 14, 2021. It reached number one in Dominican Republic, as well as the top 15 in several other countries such as Argentina and Spain, and on Billboards Hot Latin Songs in the United States. "Todo de Ti" was released for digital download and streaming on May 20, 2021, as the second single from the album. The song was ranked among the Best Summer Songs of All Time by Rolling Stone. It was nominated for both Record of the Year and Song of the Year at the 22nd Annual Latin Grammy Awards. The track became a massive global hit, reaching number one in Argentina, Bolivia, Chile, Colombia, Costa Rica, Dominican Republic, Ecuador, El Salvador, Guatemala, Honduras, Latin America, Mexico, Nicaragua, Panama, Paraguay, Peru, Puerto Rico, Spain, and Uruguay. The track was subsequently ranked as the best-performing song of 2021 in both Latin America and Spain. "Todo de Ti" also reached the top three on Billboards Hot Latin Songs and Billboard Global 200 charts, becoming the third all-Spanish song in history to reach the top three on the latter.

The third single from Vice Versa, "Sexo Virtual" was released on June 25, 2021, accompanied by a Nuno Gomes directed music video, alongside the album. The song reached number one in El Salvador, Guatemala, Honduras, and Panama. It also debuted in the top 20 of Hot Latin Songs, and was certified platinum in both Mexico and Spain. "Desenfocao'" was issued to Latin American radio stations on August 10, 2021, as the first promotional single from the album.<ref>{{cite news|url=https://reportes.monitorlatino.com/Reports/DetalleSearch/Canciones/pisong,705321582|title='Desenfocao Rauw Alejandro - Sony Music|publisher=Monitor Latino|language=es|access-date=December 3, 2022|url-access=subscription|archive-date=December 3, 2022|archive-url=https://web.archive.org/web/20221203234051/https://reportes.monitorlatino.com/Reports/DetalleSearch/Canciones/pisong,705321582|url-status=live}}</ref> An accompanying music video, directed by Alejandro and NINE-D, was released on the same date. After going viral on TikTok and achieving commercial success, "Cúrame" was sent to radio stations on August 27, 2021, as the fourth single from the album. A music video for the song, directed by Nuno Gomes, was released on September 16, 2021. The song reached number one in Colombia and Dominican Republic, as well as the top three in Spain. It also reached the summit of the Billboards Latin Airplay and Latin Rhythm Airplay charts in the United States.

"Nubes" was released on August 31, 2021, as the second promotional single, while its music video was directed by Fernando Lugo and released simultaneously with the song. The album's final single, "Desesperados" was launched for digital download and streaming on December 9, 2021. The song was ranked among the 100 Greatest Reggaeton Songs of All Time by Rolling Stone. It was nominated for Best Reggaeton Performance and Best Urban Song at the 23rd Annual Latin Grammy Awards. The track peaked at number one in Bolivia, Colombia, Dominican Republic, Ecuador, Honduras, Nicaragua, Peru, Spain, and Uruguay, and reached the top five in Argentina, Chile, El Salvador, Latin America, and Mexico, and on the Hot Latin Songs. It also reached the summit of the Latin Airplay and Latin Rhythm Airplay charts, and peaked at number 13 on the Billboard Global 200. An accompanying music video, released simultaneously with the song, was directed by Manson.

Other charted and certified songs
"Aquel Nap ZzZz" peaked at number 37 on the US Hot Latin Songs chart and number 64 in Spain. "Cosa Guapa" and "La Old Skul" reached numbers 53 and 45 in Spain, respectively, while the latter was certified platinum in the country. "La Old Skul" also peaked at number seven on Monitor Latino's Chile Urbano chart. "Brazilera" was certified gold by Pro-Música Brasil for track-equivalent sales of over 20,000 units in Brazil.

Marketing
ReleaseVice Versa was released for digital download and streaming by Sony Music Latin and Duars Entertainment on June 25, 2021. It featured a 17-second interlude, entitled "Track 4", consisting of electronic sounds and a robot voice repeating the word "loading". On December 9, 2021, the album was re-released with "Desesperados" replacing "Track 4" on the album.

Live performances

To further promote Vice Versa, he embarked on the Rauw Alejandro World Tour and the Vice Versa Tour. The former began on July 15, 2021 at the Enigma Night Club in Raleigh, North Carolina, and concluded on December 18, 2021, at the Fair Expo Center in Miami, with concerts throughout the United States, Mexico, Spain, Puerto Rico, and Dominican Republic. The Vice Versa Tour began on January 15, 2022, at the Crypto.com Arena in Los Angeles, and concluded on June 11, 2022, at the Parc del Fòrum in Barcelona, with 26 shows across the United States, Latin America, and Spain. DVILA, Joonti, and Pailita served as supporting acts on the tour.

In addition to his tours, Alejandro performed singles from Vice Versa on several television programs and award shows. He performed "Todo de Ti" on The Kelly Clarkson Show, 2021 MTV Millennial Awards, and the 2021 Billboard Latin Music Awards. He gave a live performance of "Desenfocao'" and "Cúrame" in a special two-song set with Billboard and Honda Stage. Alejandro and Corleone performed "Desesperados" on The Tonight Show Starring Jimmy Fallon on April 6, 2022. On May 15, 2022, Alejandro performed a medley of "Cúrame", "Museo", and "Todo de Ti" at the 2022 Billboard Music Awards. On November 17, 2022, the singer gave a live performance of "Lejos del Cielo", "Más de Una Vez", "Desesperados", and "Punto 40" at the 23rd Annual Latin Grammy Awards.

Critical receptionVice Versa received generally favorable reviews from music critics. Rolling Stones Lucas Villa described the album as "great" and noted Alejandro's "versatility", starting that there is "no limits" to his "malleable flow" and that he "takes reggaeton into the future" with Vice Versa. Also in his review for The Fader, Villa praised Alejandro for taking his signature "genres to new worlds altogether", proving "his ability to write captivating songs regardless of the style he chooses". He continued: "He's taking Latin pop into the future on Vice Versa; at the very least, he's set himself up as one of its biggest stars." An author of Genius admired the singer for "fearlessly" displaying his "adaptability", "craftwork", and "versatility" on the album, describing it as "a memorable rollercoaster ride": "VICE VERSA is a look into how the future of Latin music should be like; filled with hard-hitting pop beats, undeniable confidence, and addicting well-produced tracks that will undoubtedly leave their thread woven in history." Jon Caramanica from The New York Times, named Alejandro "the most imaginative meta-reggaeton Latin pop star" and adored his "synthetically sweet and appealingly lush" vocals. Also from The New York Times, Isabelia Herrera celebrated the album for "embracing melody and an unflinching (but calculated) desire to implode the traditional structures of pop and reggaeton". NPR critic Stefanie Fernández labeled it "a record that sets the standard for what a massively successful Latin pop album can, and should, accomplish".

Writing for Mondo Sonoro, Luis M. Maínez named Vice Versa "the best reggaeton album in recent years" and praised Alejandro's "particular and unmistakable style that until now no one has been able to copy". He compared the album to "the most revolutionary styles in history", saying "all tracks flow into each other with precision and organicity, with Rauw's vocals making the electric shock that unites everything". The critic highlighted "Sexo Virtual", "Cosa Guapa", "Desenfocao'", "La Old Skul", and "Aquel Nap ZzZz". Rolling Stones Julyssa Lopez noted the singer's "thrillingly unpredictable breakthrough" and the album's "unexpected beat switches and sudden flashes of house, bolero, and Brazilian funk, morphs constantly", highlighting "Todo de Ti" as its "crowning jewel". Jason Lipshutz from Billboard stated that Vice Versa "serves as the progressive vision for Latin urban music that Alejandro wants to set forth from the A-list" and compared Alejandro with the American rapper and singer Doja Cat as he "comfortably sings and raps in equal measures, grabbing whatever instrumental arrangement is thrown his direction".

AccoladesRolling Stone hailed Vice Versa as the best Spanish-language or bilingual album of 2021 and the third-best album of the year. The Fader and The New York Times ranked it at numbers 5 and 11 on their overall albums year-end lists. Billboard placed it on an unranked list of the 20 Best Latin Albums of 2021, while naming it as the 37th-best album of the year overall. Teen Vogue and NPR listed Vice Versa among the best albums of 2021 and best Latin albums of the year, respectively, and Genius ranked it as the 23rd best album of 2021. The album has received a number of awards and nominations. It was nominated for Favorite Latin Album at the American Music Awards and Top Latin Album at the Billboard Music Awards, both in 2022.

Commercial performanceVice Versa debuted atop the US Top Latin Albums and Latin Rhythm Albums charts with first-week sales of 21,000 units, consisting of 29.1 million on-demand streams and less than 1,000 pure sales, according to data compiled by Nielsen SoundScan for the chart dated July 10, 2021. It became Alejandro's first number one album on both charts, spending two weeks at this position on each chart. The album also debuted at number 17 on the US Billboard 200, becoming the singer's second entry on the chart and his highest peak in his career, surpassing Afrodisíaco, which peaked at number 75 on November 28, 2020. By July 2022, Vice Versa had spent 54 weeks on Billboard'' 200, making it the sixth Spanish album in history to spend more weeks on the chart. The album was certified octuple platinum (Latin) by the Recording Industry Association of America (RIAA), for sales of over 480,000 units in the United States. In Spain, the album debuted at number one on July 4, 2021, and spent eight non-consecutive weeks atop the chart. It was later certified double platinum by the Productores de Música de España (PROMUSICAE), for selling over 80,000 units in the country. The album was also certified 2× platinum + gold by the Asociación Mexicana de Productores de Fonogramas y Videogramas (AMPROFON), for sales of over 350,000 units in Mexico.

Track listing
Track listing adapted from Tidal.

Personnel
Credits adapted from Tidal.

Musicians

 Rauw Alejandro vocals 
 Carlos Orlando Navarro guitar , performance arranging 
 Chencho Corleone vocals 
 Kenobi backing vocals 
 Charlie Handsome guitar 
 Lyanno vocals 
 Anitta vocals 

Technical

 El Zorro production 
 Colla mix engineering , record engineering , master engineering 
 Eric Duars executive production 
 Sensei Sound  master engineering 
 Kenobi record engineering , production 
 Tainy production 
 Albert Hype production 
 Caleb Calloway production 
 Mr. NaisGai production 
 Dulce como Candy production 
 Dímelo Ninow production 
 Orteez production 
 Álvarito production 
 Charlie Handsome production , record engineering 
 Eydren production 
 Manu Lara production 
 Phantom production

Charts

Weekly charts

Year-end charts

Certifications

Release history

References

2021 albums
Albums produced by Tainy
Rauw Alejandro albums
Sony Music Latin albums
Spanish-language albums